Stanovtsovo is a rural locality (a village) in Petushinskoye Rural Settlement, Petushinsky District, Vladimir Oblast, Russia. The population was 3 in 2010.

Geography 
Yermolino is the nearest rural locality.

References 

Rural localities in Petushinsky District